Nolan Thomas (born Marko Kalfa, 24 August 1966, Jersey City, NJ) is a fashion photographer and former actor and Latin freestyle artist, mostly known for his 1984 single "Yo' Little Brother" which peaked at #57 on the Billboard Hot 100. Kalfa was discovered by dance-music producers Mark Liggett and Chris Barbosa of Shannon ("Let the Music Play") fame when he was still in high school. While he did appear in the music video of "Yo' Little Brother" and sang all of the other tracks on the Yo' Little Brother album, he did not actually perform the vocals on this particular track: Elan Lanier sang them instead. The original 12-inch single of "Yo' Little Brother" was initially released by Emergency Records. The music video was conceived by the Manager-Director-Producer team of Stu Sleppin & Bob Teeman who created the rock star look-a-likes (Cyndi Lauper, Billy Idol, Rick Ocasek, Bruce Springsteen) that became known as The Vid Kids. Nolan Thomas & The Vid Kids toured the US in the mid 1980s. A full-length LP was released by Mirage/Atco/Atlantic Records in 1984, which yielded two more singles to modest success. In the UK during the mid-1980s "Yo' Little Brother"  received some cult status after it was aired on Channel 4's The Max Headroom Show. In 1989 he released the single "Once Around The Block", under the name Mark Kalfa.

Kalfa is currently a fashion photographer working in New York.

Selected Discography
"Yo' Little Brother" 7-inch single (Mirage/Atco/Atlantic Records 99697)#26 US R&B, #57 US POP
Yo' Little Brother album (Mirage/Atco/Atlantic Records 90283)
1984—"One Bad Apple" (Mirage/Atco/Atlantic Records 99651) #48 US R&B, #105 US BUBBLING UNDER SINGLES

References

External links
Kalfaco.com

American freestyle musicians
Living people
Mirage Records artists
1966 births